The Cup with Cover is known for the power of the Cup, the "exotic coconut." These coconuts had a very strong power, anything that was put into these cups would become neutralized.

The writing and symbols seen on the cup are themes from the Old Testament that give the cup the power. The three themes are engraved on the cup as is:

GENESIS:C:19 (Lot and his daughters)
 IVDICVM C:14 (Samson and the Lion)
 2 Regum Cap II (David and Bathsheba)

It did not take long before many other Artist were designing these outstanding coconut cups. Some of the artist were Albrecht Altdorfer, Hans Brosamer, and Hieronymus Hopfer.

Description 
Around coconut:

 GENESIS:C:19 (Lot and his daughters)
 IVDICVM C:14 (Samson and the Lion)
 2 Regum Cap II (David and Bathsheba)

On edge of cover: inscription in Greek Letters: Often in floods of wine a man is wrecked

Below lip: POCVLA SVME / FLVET MELIVS POST POCVLA SERMO  (quaff your cups; after cups speech flows more readily)

On rim of foot: MMODIC[us] LAEDIT CEV DIRA CICVTA LVAEVS NON FACIT AD LONGAM CRAPVLA MVLTA DIEM

Translation: wine immoderately drunk is harmful as the deadly hemlock; frequent surfeit makes not for long life]

Struck On foot:

 crown on top ('s-Hertogenbosch town mark, beginning 1503/4);
 [(date letter "g", 1533/34);
 Stylized star flame (maker's mark of Hans van Amsterdam, recorded 1535–65)
 Engraved under foot: 14 omin Z (weight of piece?)

Example 

A prime example of another Coconut Cup with Old Testament Scenes on it was made by Cornelis de Bye in 1598. The coconuts they used for this came from Africa and the East Indies and they would mount the coconut on a shiny silver mount. On this particular cup it had a marking that read,"Drunkenness is the root of all evil." This relates to the writing on the coconut that was created by Hans Van Amsterdam. The story of Lot and his daughters, Samson and the Lion, and David and Bathsheba were all told on this famous Coconut cup.

History 
The Medieval English Coconut story written by Kennedy, Kathleen is one that describes the enriched history of the Coconut cup. It was a shock to most people that believed that these coconuts were just showing up in England. As the story goes some believed that they were brought to the land from birds but that did not make much sense as the bird would not be able to carry these coconuts because of the weight. Later on it is discovered that the people England were trading with the people of India for these miraculous cups. Almost everyone had a coconut cup on hand in their house fully customized to their own needs backed with mass amounts of history.

References 

Individual vases
Silver-gilt objects